Ricardo Alberto de Jesus Pinto (born 28 November 1991), also known as Ricardinho, is a Portuguese futsal player who plays for Braga/AAUM and the Portugal national team.

References

External links

1991 births
Living people
Portuguese men's futsal players
Sportspeople from Porto